In mathematics, Liouville's formula, also known as the Abel-Jacobi-Liouville Identity, is an equation that expresses the determinant of a square-matrix solution of a first-order system of homogeneous linear differential equations in terms of the sum of the diagonal coefficients of the system. The formula is named after the French mathematician Joseph Liouville.  Jacobi's formula provides another representation of the same mathematical relationship.

Liouville's formula is a generalization of Abel's identity and can be used to prove it. Since Liouville's formula relates the different linearly independent solutions of the system of differential equations, it can help to find one solution from the other(s), see the example application below.

Statement of Liouville's formula
Consider the -dimensional first-order homogeneous linear differential equation

on an interval  of the real line, where  for  denotes a square matrix of dimension  with real or complex entries.

Let

Example application
This example illustrates how Liouville's formula can help to find the general solution of a first-order system of homogeneous linear differential equations. Consider

on the open interval . Assume that the easy solution

is already found. Let

denote another solution, then

is a square-matrix-valued solution of the above differential equation.

Therefore, by integration, we see that

involving the natural logarithm and the constant of integration .

With the special choice  and  we recover the easy solution we started with, the choice  and  yields a linearly independent solution. Therefore,

is a so-called fundamental solution of the system.

Proof of Liouville's formula
We omit the argument  for brevity. By the Leibniz formula for determinants, the derivative of the determinant of  can be calculated by differentiating one row at a time and taking the sum, i.e.

Since the matrix-valued solution  satisfies the equation , we have for every entry of the matrix 

or for the entire row

When we subtract from the -th row the linear combination

of all the other rows, then the value of the determinant remains unchanged, hence

for every } by the linearity of the determinant with respect to every row. Hence

It remains to show that this representation of the derivative implies Liouville's formula.

Fix .

is a well defined function. Differentiating both sides, using the product rule, the chain rule, the derivative of the exponential function and the fundamental theorem of calculus, we obtain

References
 
 

Mathematical identities
Ordinary differential equations
Articles containing proofs